A prairie dog is a rodent native to North America.  Prairie dog may also refer to:

Animals
 Black-tailed prairie dog
 Gunnison's prairie dog
 Mexican prairie dog
 Utah prairie dog
 White-tailed prairie dog

Places
 Prairie Dog State Park, a state park in Kansas
 Prairie Dog Town Fork Red River, a branch of the Red River of Texas
 Prairie Dog Township, Decatur County, Kansas
 Prairie Dog Township, Harlan County, Nebraska

See also
 Prairie Dog (album), an album by Duke Pearson
 Prairie Dog Central Railway, a railway in Winnipeg, Manitoba, Canada

Animal common name disambiguation pages